Voradep Ho FC (often called as Voradep) is a Ghanaian professional football club based in Ho. They are a currently competing in the Ghana Football Leagues.

In 1992 the team has won the Ghanaian FA Cup

History

Honours
Ghanaian FA Cup: 1992

Performance in CAF competitions
1993 African Cup Winners' Cup: first round

Current squad 

For recent transfers, see List of transfers 2017

References

External links

Football clubs in Ghana
Volta Region